Peter Joseph Arnoudt (or Aernoudt, Arnold) (born at Moere, Belgium, 17 May 1811; died at Cincinnati, 29 July 1865) was a Belgian Jesuit writer on devotional subjects.

Life

He entered the Society of Jesus at Florissant, Missouri, in 1831. After the usual course of Jesuit training, he was appointed to teach in the colleges in the Missouri province of the Society. While engaged in teaching he proved himself to be a finished Greek scholar.

Works
He composed in Latin the De Imitatione Sacri Cordis Jesu. It was written to promote devotion to the Sacred Heart of Jesus, in fulfilment of a vow he had made in a time of illness. He sent the manuscript to Rome in 1846, and ten years later it was approved by Father General Roothaan. The work was published on the Benzinger press at Einsiedeln, 1863. It was translated into English by Father Fastre and published at Cincinnati in 1865. Translations were also made into French, German, Spanish, Portuguese, Italian, Flemish, and Hungarian. The French translation, published at Besançon, passed through eighteen editions between the years 1864 to 1887. Sommervogel gives the titles of two English, two Flemish, and four French versions of Father Arnoudt's work.

According to Father de Smet, the well known missionary, Father Arnoudt left at his death the following manuscripts: a Greek epic poem of about 1,200 verses, a collection of Greek odes, and Greek grammar, and these ascetical works: The Glories of Jesus, The Delight of the Sacred Heart of Jesus, and a collection of spiritual retreats entitled The Abode of the Sacred Heart.

References

Vanderspeeten, Notice biographique sur le P. Pierre Arnoudt, de la c. de J. (Tournay, 1873);
De Smet in Précis historiques (1866).
In the London ed. of The Imitation of the Sacred Heart (1867) and the Tournay ed. (1872) are published notices of the author by Russell and Van den Hofstadt respectively.

Father Arnoudt's relatives in Belgium have preserved forty-six of his autograph letters.

Notes

References

Attribution

1811 births
1865 deaths
19th-century Belgian Jesuits
People from Gistel